Abijah Beckwith was a member of the Wisconsin State Assembly.

Biography
Beckwith was born on November 10, 1843 in Columbia, New York. In 1867, he settled in Bear Creek, Sauk County, Wisconsin. He died on June 22, 1897 and was buried in Bear Valley, Wisconsin.

Career
Beckwith was a member of the Assembly during the 1882 session. Previously, he was Chairman (similar to Mayor) of Bear Creek in 1879. He was a Republican.

References

External links

Wisconsin Historical Society

Republican Party members of the Wisconsin State Assembly
Mayors of places in Wisconsin
19th-century American politicians
1843 births
1897 deaths
Burials in Wisconsin
People from Herkimer County, New York
People from Sauk County, Wisconsin